Federico Andrés Zeballos Melgar (born 30 May 1988) is a Bolivian tennis player.

Zeballos has a career high ATP singles ranking of 440 achieved on 8 October 2018. He also has a career high ATP doubles ranking of 175, achieved on 17 December 2018. Zeballos has won 5 ITF singles title and 27 ITF doubles titles.

Zeballos has represented Bolivia at Davis Cup, where he has a win–loss record of 23–17.

His sister, Noelia, is also a tennis player. Neither sibling is related to Argentine tennis player Horacio Zeballos.

Future and Challenger finals

Singles: 13 (5–8)

Notes

External links 
 
 
 

1988 births
Living people
Bolivian male tennis players
Sportspeople from Santa Cruz de la Sierra
Tennis players at the 2015 Pan American Games
Pan American Games medalists in tennis
Tennis players at the 2019 Pan American Games
Pan American Games silver medalists for Bolivia
Tennis players at the 2011 Pan American Games
Medalists at the 2019 Pan American Games